Ryburn is a ward to the southwest of Halifax in the metropolitan borough of Calderdale, West Yorkshire, England.  It contains 84 listed buildings that are recorded in the National Heritage List for England.  Of these, two are listed at Grade I, the highest of the three grades, three are at Grade II*, the middle grade, and the others are at Grade II, the lowest grade.  The largest settlement in the ward is the village of Sowerby.  There are some smaller settlements, including Mill Bank, but the rest of the ward is essentially rural.   There is an industrial complex to the southeast of Sowerby around a former mill, Mill House Estate,  and some of the buildings in this complex are listed.  The River Ryburn runs through the ward, and a bridge crossing it is listed.  Most of the listed buildings are houses and associated structures, cottages, farmhouses and farm buildings.  The other listed buildings include churches, items in a churchyard, a public house, a milepost, former mills, a mill chimney, and a former chapel.


Key

Buildings

See also

Listed buildings in Sowerby Bridge

References

Citations

Sources

Lists of listed buildings in West Yorkshire